is a private university in Daitō, Osaka, Japan. It is abbreviated as "DaiSanDai" using the first characters of its name. It was established in 1923 as Osaka Railway School. The university has six faculties and four graduate schools. Its campuses are in the Nakagaito area of Daito City, Osaka close to the ancient Japanese capital of Nara. A satellite campus is in the Umeda district of Osaka. There are about 11,000 students; 10% of them are international students. It is one of the major universities in Japan with a higher number of international students.    
In 2004, it was selected as one of the special universities under the Educational Support Program for Special Universities (特色ある大学教育支援プログラム) of the Ministry of Education, Culture, Sports, Science and Technology of the Japanese Government. The university's award-winning clean-energy solar car project frequently participated in domestic and international clean energy competitions. Yoshihiko Motoyama (本山美彦), former chairman of the Japan Society of International Economics, is its current president. Yoshikuni Dobashi, former president of Kubota Corporation, is the chairman of the board of directors.

History 
 1928 Established as Osaka Railway School
 1950 Developed as Osaka Transportation College
1965 Developed as Osaka Industrial University
 1988 English name was changed from Osaka Industrial University to Osaka Sangyo University

Organization

Faculties
 School of Engineering
Department of Mechanical Engineering
Department of Information Systems Engineering
Department of Electronics, Information and Communication Engineering
Department of Mechanical Engineering for Transportation
Department of Civil Engineering
 School of Economics
 School of Human Environment 
 School of Management
 School of Education
 School of Design Engineering

Graduate schools
 Graduate School of Engineering
Division of Production Systems Engineering
Department of Information Systems Engineering
Department of Electronics, Information and Communication Engineering
Department of Mechanical Engineering
Department of Mechanical Engineering for Transportation
Division of Environmental Design Engineering
 Graduate School of Economics
 Graduate School of Human Environment
 Graduate School of Management

Research institutes
 OSU Institute for Industrial Research
 New Industrial Research and Development Center
 Asian Community Research Center

Venture business
OSU Digital Media Factory
OSU Corporation
OSU Health Support Academy Inc.
Robust Engineering Corporation

Solar Car Project 
Osaka Sangyo University started the OSU Solar Car Project as an industry-academia project-based learning program since 1989. The project is focused on the research and development of high efficiency solar cars. The project is funded by major Japanese corporations including Panasonic, Citizen Holdings etc. OSU solar car models have been presented in domestic and international clean energy competitions.

External links
 Official website

References

Educational institutions established in 1928
Private universities and colleges in Japan
Universities and colleges in Osaka Prefecture
1928 establishments in Japan
Kansai Collegiate American Football League
Daitō, Osaka